Zogu is a community in the Savelugu-Nanton District in the Northern Region of Ghana.

See also
Suburbs of Tamale (Ghana) metropolis

References 

Communities in Ghana